Pacific Green designs and manufactures furniture and architectural products. It is most recognised for its development of Palmwood, a sustainable substitute for tropical hardwood. Pacific Green products are distributed internationally.

Post & Rail Furniture
Post & Rail Furniture was started by Bruce Dowse and Peter Ryan in 1973 in Sydney, Australia. They created an iconic style of Australian furniture, including the classic INVESTMENT chair. From its earliest days, the company used plantation wood in its pieces.

International expansion 
As it expanded internationally in the late 1980s, the company rebranded as Pacific Green. Its purpose was to create a viable substitute for tropical hardwoods by recycling plantation coconut palms. Although palms are extremely hard and durable, their unique properties made them difficult to work using conventional techniques. Starting in Papua New Guinea, and later in the Fiji, the team established the world’s first factory dedicated to the research and development of coconut palms.

In 1996, Pacific Green opened its first US warehouse and showroom in Los Angeles, followed by retail outlets in Eastern Europe. In 2007, the company established an assembly plant in southern China and flagship retail stores in Asia.

Development of hardwood substitutes
Palmwood was the name Pacific Green gave to the finished ‘hardwood’ material it developed. Process breakthroughs had created a durable consumer-oriented product that was suitable in a variety of climates and resilient to wood-boring insects. Palmwood is an ecologically sustainable timber alternative.

Palmwood was chosen as the sustainable exterior wood for Masdar, the world's first 'eco-city' in Abu Dhabi, including gates, screens and doors.

Indigenous design
The designs of the furniture - by Bruce Dowse and his Australian design team - are inspired by the artefacts and tools of traditional societies, using natural materials sourced from around the World. Each piece is handcrafted by artisans using traditional techniques and is designed to give a sense of its global ethnic origins.

Socially responsible manufacturing
Pacific Green pioneered the creation of a socially responsible industry for the Pacific region. By recycling unproductive coconut palms, old plantation land was returned to the local villages to replant with young fruit-bearing palms and other cash crops. The factory was built in consultation with the surrounding villages, and the land used was leased from the villagers to respect local ownership. Pacific Green Industries (Fiji) Limited is listed on the South Pacific Stock Exchange and its majority owners are the Fijian people.

Manufacturing processes use no toxins or chemicals and by-products are reused. In 2001, Pacific Green addressed the United Nations Conference on Trade and Development (UNCTAD) on the social responsibility of manufacturing companies. Pacific Green also advised the United Nations Food and Agriculture Organization on its study on Coconut Palm Stems. From the mid-1990s to early-2000s, actor Pierce Brosnan was the company's Environmental Spokesperson to coincide with the company's expansion into North America.

As a result, Pacific Green was invited to participate at the World Expo 2010 within the Pacific Pavilion.

Pacific Green unveiled the Indigenous Masterpieces concept at its debut in Milan's Salone del Mobile in 2011. It was the only Australian company to participate at the prestigious show 2011-2017.

References

External links
 Pacific Green website
 Pacific Green Architecture (Palmwood) website

Companies based in Sydney
Design companies established in 1973
Manufacturing companies established in 1973
1973 establishments in Australia